Harumi Kohara (born 24 June 1965) is a Japanese badminton player. She competed in women's singles and women's doubles at the 1992 Summer Olympics in Barcelona.

References

External links

1965 births
Living people
Japanese female badminton players
Olympic badminton players of Japan
Badminton players at the 1992 Summer Olympics
Asian Games medalists in badminton
Badminton players at the 1986 Asian Games
Asian Games silver medalists for Japan
Medalists at the 1986 Asian Games